Polygala rehmannii is a species of flowering plant in the milkwort family (Polygalaceae). It is endemic to areas with an altitude below  in Southern Africa. It was first described by Robert Chodat in 1893.

Description
The species is a perennial herb with a height between  growing from a woody rootstock. Just like the stem, the leaves are glabrous. The flowers the plant produces are blue or greenish-blue.

Conservation
The Red List of South African Plants list the species as of least conservation concern.

References 

rehmannii